Qazi Nisar Ahmed is a Deobandi Muslim cleric and chief of the Tanzeem Ahle Sunnah wal Jamaat in Gilgit-Baltistan, Pakistan. He went into hiding on 15 October 2005, when the government sealed two mosques in response to sectarian clashes between Sunnis and Shias, and ordered the arrests of seven top clerics of both sects, including Qazi Nisar.He can be saw in many videos trying to get empathy by sectarian and extremist outlawed parties like LEJ and TTP to spread sectarian violence across the country threatening Government, its law and order by showing his large number of supporters outside Gilgit Baltistan . He was reported to be living outside of Pakistan. Northern Areas had requested that Interpol arrest him; however, he instead returned of his own free will on the evening of 10 March 2006 and surrendered to Gilgit police, who flew him to Islamabad.

References

External links 
 www.dailyhimalaya.com.pk

Living people
People from Gilgit-Baltistan
Pakistani religious leaders
Pakistani clergy
Pakistani Sunni Muslims
Year of birth missing (living people)